The Aloha 27 is a series of Canadian sailboats, that were designed by American yacht designer Robert Perry and first built in 1979 under the designation Aloha 26.

The Aloha 26, 27, 8.2, 271 are all closely related designs. Although the hulls are identical and were produced in the same mould, the builders used several different sail and mast suppliers during the production run of the designs and specifications for the boats produced varied accordingly. Many of the boats produced have interchangeable sails and other parts. Despite having so many designations for the vessel, Aloha 27 is colloquially used as the model designation.

The Aloha 27 should not be confused with the slightly larger Aloa 27 which was designed by Frans Maas and built in France by Aloa Marine, starting in 1976.

Production
The design was built between 1979 and 1987 by Ouyang Boat Works in Whitby, Ontario, Canada, under the Aloha Yachts brand. During that period the company built 188 of the Aloha 27 design.

Design

The Aloha 27 series are all small recreational keelboats, built predominantly of fibreglass, with wood trim. They all have fractional sloop rigs, internally-mounted spade-type rudders and fixed fin keels. They are fitted with a tiller, although a wheel was a factory option. They all displace  and carry  of ballast encapsulated inside a fibreglass keel.

The boat came with an outboard motor provision as standard with the option of an inboard BMW, Volvo Penta or Westerbeke diesel engine powering a saildrive unit.

The original production run boats featured such amenities as Barient winches, tufted crushed velour cushions, oversized spars, pulpit and lifelines, as well as internal halyards.

Of the interior accommodations, reviewer Michael McGoldrick noted:

Operational history
In an interview in Sail Universe, two Aloha 8.2 owners described the design:

Variants

Aloha 26
Aloha 27
Aloha 8.2
Aloha 271

See also
List of sailing boat types

Similar sailboats
C&C 27
Cal 27
Cal 2-27
Cal 3-27
Catalina 27
Catalina 270
Catalina 275 Sport
Crown 28
CS 27
Edel 820
Express 27
Fantasia 27
Halman Horizon
Hotfoot 27
Hullmaster 27
Hunter 27
Hunter 27-2
Hunter 27-3
Irwin 27 
Island Packet 27
Mirage 27 (Perry)
Mirage 27 (Schmidt)
O'Day 272
Orion 27-2
Tanzer 27
Watkins 27
Watkins 27P

References

External links

Keelboats
1970s sailboat type designs
Sailing yachts
Sailboat type designs by Robert Perry
Sailboat types built by Ouyang Boat Works